Mohammed Christophe Bilek or Moh-Christophe Bilek (born 1950) is an Algerian author and former Muslim who has lived in France since 1961.

Bilek was baptized in 1970, and since then has written two books: Un algérien pas Très Catholique (A not very Catholic Algerian), published by Éditions du Cerf (1999), and Saint Augustin Raconté à Ma Fille (Saint Augustine as told to my daughter), published by Éditions Qabel (2011). In the 1990s, he founded the Our Lady of Kabyle (in French), a website devoted to evangelization among Muslims and Muslim-Christian dialogue.

Bilek is a member of the Kabyle people.

Works
A Not Very Catholic Algerian, 1999
Saint Augustine As Told to My Daughter, 2011

References

External links
 https://web.archive.org/web/20121206225900/http://www.maghrebchristians.com/2012/08/12/algerian-muslim-convert-talks-about-christ/#ixzz247YeaG8y
 http://www.notredamedekabylie.net/
 http://bigsam68.skyrock.com/2999093481-Temoignage-d-un-converti-par-Mohammed-Christophe-Bilek.html

1950 births
Living people
Algerian former Muslims
Algerian Roman Catholics
Converts to Roman Catholicism from Islam
French former Muslims
French people of Algerian descent
French Roman Catholics
Berber Christians
Berber Algerians
Kabyle people